Virginia Oglesby Zanuck ( Fox; April 19,  was an American actress who starred in many silent films of the 1910s and 1920s.

Life and career

Fox was born as Virginia Oglesby Fox in Wheeling, West Virginia (though her grave erroneously lists Charleston, West Virginia, as her place of birth), the daughter of Mary Elizabeth (née Oglesby) and Frederick Fox. 

While on vacation from boarding school, Fox traveled to visit a friend in Los Angeles. The two made a casual stop by the studio of Mack Sennett, where she was hired on the spot and made a bathing beauty in the studio's films. She went on to star as leading lady in many of the early films of Buster Keaton, including 1920's highly regarded Neighbors. 

On January 12, 1924, she married film producer Darryl F. Zanuck, with whom she had three children, Darrylin, Susan Marie, and Richard Darryl. Fox retired from acting but was known as a behind-the-scenes influence on her husband's business decisions. The couple separated in 1956 over the studio mogul's affairs with other women, although they never legally divorced. According to Zanuck biographers, she cared for him at their home from the time he became mentally incapacitated in the early 1970s until his death in 1979.

Despite some Internet accounts to the contrary, Virginia Fox was not related to William Fox, whose name is preserved in the 20th Century Fox film studio, which Darryl Zanuck created and led for decades. William Fox founded Fox Studios but had lost control of it by the time Zanuck acquired it and merged it into his own empire.

Death
 
On October 14, 1982, Fox died of a lung infection complicated by emphysema at her home in Santa Monica, California after having been sick for about a year. She was buried near Darryl Zanuck at the Westwood Village Memorial Park Cemetery in Westwood, Los Angeles.

Filmography

Notes

References

External links

 

Year of birth uncertain
1982 deaths
American film actresses
Actresses from West Virginia
American silent film actresses
Burials at Westwood Village Memorial Park Cemetery
Deaths from emphysema
Deaths from thrombosis
Actors from Wheeling, West Virginia
20th-century American actresses
Age controversies